Fiona Hefti (born 4 May 1980 in Zurich, Switzerland) was Miss Switzerland 2004 and a contestant in the Miss World 2004 and Miss Universe 2005 pageants. She went on to compete in Miss World 2004 where she was unplaced. She also competed in Miss Universe 2005 and finished in the top 10.  She was the 9th Swiss to placed in the semifinalists.

In 2007, she married Christian Wolfensberger. They are the parents of three children.

Sources
 article on Hefti
 article on Hefti
 article on Hefti

External links
 

1980 births
Living people
Miss Universe 2005 contestants
Miss World 2004 delegates
People from Zürich
Swiss beauty pageant winners
Swiss female models